The First Amendment Center supports the First Amendment and builds understanding of its core freedoms through education, information and entertainment.

The center serves as a forum for the study and exploration of free-expression issues, including freedom of speech, of the press and of religion, and the rights to assemble and to petition the government.

Founded by John Seigenthaler, the First Amendment Center is an operating program of the Freedom Forum and is associated with the Newseum and the Diversity Institute. The center has offices in the John Seigenthaler Center at Vanderbilt University in Nashville, Tennessee, and at the Newseum in Washington, D.C.

The center's programs, including the Religious Freedom Education Project at the Newseum, provide education and information to the public and groups including First Amendment scholars and experts, educators, government policy makers, legal experts and students. The center is nonpartisan and does not lobby, litigate or provide legal advice.

The center's website is a source of news, information, and commentary in the nation on First Amendment issues. It features daily updates on news about First Amendment-related developments, as well as detailed reports about U.S. Supreme Court cases involving the First Amendment, and commentary, analysis and special reports on free expression, press freedom and religious-liberty issues.

See also
First Amendment
List of prominent cases argued by Floyd Abrams

External links
 
 First Amendment Schools project 
 John Seigenthaler Center at Vanderbilt University

Freedom of expression organizations
Civil liberties advocacy groups in the United States
Organizations established in 1991
Vanderbilt University
1991 establishments in the United States